= Open History Project =

- Founded: 2014, Justin Shenk and Lena Dorfschmidt
- Purpose: Journalism
- Region served: Global
- Website: openhistoryproject.com

Open History Project is an international community of writers, oral historians, and digital activists who translate and gather interviews on global and historical topics. The organization was founded by Justin Shenk and Lena Dorfschmidt. In 2017, it became an independent non-profit incorporated in Osnabrück, Germany, under Open History e.V.

Open History Project includes several hundred volunteers and translators.

Open History Project serves as a resource for academics. Interviews from the site have been published in the academic journals Global Studies of Childhood, and Voluntaris.
